Koho is a Finnish brand of ice hockey equipment, especially known for its goaltending equipment throughout the 1990s and early 2000s. The brand name is currently owned by retail chain MonkeySports, which acquired it in 2008.

History

The brand was founded by the Karhu Company in the 1950s, launching a line of ice hockey sticks. By the mid 1970s they started making goaltending equipment. They were one of the first companies to produce team colored pro leather leg pads for goalies as early as 1976. In the 1980s Billy Smith, Grant Fuhr, Mario Gosselin, Kari Takko and Mike Vernon were some of the NHL goalies to use the brand. That success made Koho the largest Finnish manufacturer in the 1980s.

In 2008, retail company MonkeySports acquired rights to the brand.

See also

 CCM (The Hockey Company)

References

External links

Finnish brands
ice hockey brands
sporting goods brands
sporting goods manufacturers of Finland